Grant McEachran (1894–1966) was an English professional footballer who played as a full-back.

References

1894 births
1966 deaths
Footballers from Barrow-in-Furness
English footballers
Association football fullbacks
Barrow A.F.C. players
Grimsby Town F.C. players
Doncaster Rovers F.C. players
Halifax Town A.F.C. players
English Football League players
Footballers from Cumbria